Ethmia pseudoscythrella is a moth in the family Depressariidae. It was described by Rebel in 1902. It is found in Asia Minor.

The forewings are olive brown with some white scales and marks. The hindwings are blackish-grey

References

Moths described in 1902
pseudoscythrella